Noaman Omar (born 1991) is a chess player from the United Arab Emirates (UAE). He was awarded the title of International Master by FIDE in 2012.

Chess career
He has represented the UAE in a number of Chess Olympiads, including 2010 (where he scored 6½/11 on board three), 2012 (3/8 on board two),  2014 (6/11 on board two), 2016 (5½/11 on board two), and 2018 (6/10 on board one).

He qualified for the Chess World Cup 2021, where he was defeated 1½-½ by Mustafa Yilmaz in the first round.

References

External links
 
 
 

1991 births
Living people
Emirati chess players
Chess Olympiad competitors
Chess International Masters